The 2018–19 USHL season was the 40th season of the United States Hockey League as an all-junior league. The regular season ran from September 27, 2018, to April 13, 2019. The Tri-City Storm were awarded the Anderson Cup as regular season champions for accumulating 95 points over 62 games. The season concluded with the Sioux Falls Stampede defeating the Chicago Steel in the Clark Cup Final series 3–0 on May 17, 2019.

League changes
After serving as the interim commissioner since November 2017, Tom Garrity was named the ninth commissioner in league history. He replaced Bob Fallen who had served as commissioner since 2014. On April 5, 2018, the league announced the annual Fall Classic in partnership with the National Hockey League would count towards the regular season standings, with all member clubs playing two games between September 27 and 30 at the UPMC Lemieux Sports Complex in Pittsburgh.

Regular season
Final standings:

Eastern Conference

Western Conference

x = clinched playoff berth; y = clinched conference title; z = clinched regular season title

Clark Cup playoffs

Post season awards

USHL awards

All-USHL First Team

Source

All-USHL Second Team

Source

All-Rookie First Team

Source

All-Rookie Second Team

References

External links
 Official website of the United States Hockey League

United States Hockey League seasons
USHL